Trenton Americans were an American soccer club based in Trenton, New Jersey, who were members of the American Soccer League. After the 1947/48 season, the American Soccer League franchise of the Baltimore S.C. was purchased and moved to Trenton to become the Trenton Americans. After losing their playing field, the club was allowed to withdraw from the league following the 1950/51 season.

Year-by-year

References

American Soccer League (1933–1983) teams
Defunct soccer clubs in New Jersey
Sports in Trenton, New Jersey
Association football clubs established in 1953
Association football clubs disestablished in 1955
1953 establishments in New Jersey
1955 disestablishments in New Jersey